Flea, known as  in Japanese, is a fictional character in the Chrono series of video games. He is a shapeshifter that presents as feminine but identifies as a man and, in Japanese, uses feminine signifiers in his speech. He first appears in Chrono Trigger, where he serves as a subordinate to the antagonist Magus and cameos in the sequel, Chrono Cross. Flea has been recognized as a noteworthy LGBT character, particularly for non-binary and genderqueer people. Critics like writer Flynn Demarco and author William Gibbons felt disappointed by the use of stereotypes of transgender people and androgyny to represent villainy.

Concept and creation
Flea was created for Chrono Trigger by artist Akira Toriyama. He presents as feminine but identifies as a man. Flea is named Mayonnai in Japanese, a play on mayonnaise. This was changed in the English version to Flea, based on the musician of the same name. He also speaks in a tough feminine tone, using the personal pronoun . During English localization, the nature of Flea's character was partially lost due to Nintendo of America's strict policies on "sexually suggestive or explicit content." Feminine signifiers, such as a feminine manner of speaking, tildes, long vowel marks, and heart icons were absent in the English version. The Japanese version features an item called Mayonnai's Bra which was censored and changed to Flea Vest in the English version. Flea Vest was later changed to Flea Bustier in the Nintendo DS port's English localization.

Appearances
Flea first appears in Chrono Trigger. In this game, he serves as a subordinate to one of the game's antagonists, Magus. He is encountered by the protagonists in Magus' Castle where he is mistaken for a woman. He clarifies that he is actually a man and elaborates that he views gender as irrelevant in comparison to power and beauty. Flea uses various attacks that inflict status effects including blind, confuse, and rage. Flea is defeated, but returns along with fellow subordinates, Ozzie and Slash, to do battle against Magus who had defected to join the protagonists. Flea later appears in the sequel Chrono Cross in a cameo role in which players may choose to fight him.

Reception
Since appearing in Chrono Trigger, Flea has become an iconic character for his gender identity and expression. Authors Adrienne Shaw and Elizaveta Friesem suggested that Flea was coded as non-binary or genderqueer, while author Madeleine Brookman expressed surprise that Nintendo of America allowed the localization team to depict him the way they did. Author Michael P. Williams called Flea an inauthentic representation of trans people and drag culture, referring to him instead as an okama. He discussed how Flea's attacks represent how people react to "nontraditional genderings": he cited how Flea's status-effect attacks represent how people will "turn a blind eye" towards LGBT people, or will react with confusion or rage. He added that these kinds of reactions are a bigger threat than people like Flea. Williams noted that despite a statement by sociologist James Valentine that okama fail at passing as women, Flea passes for a woman quite well. Writer Beth Cato lamented the lack of representation for transgender people in video games, feeling that Flea's portrayal was not adequate.

Critics seized upon the importance of Flea's "power and beauty" line. Transgender game designer Paige regarded Flea as problematic despite noting that Flea's outlook on gender – that it matters less than power and beauty – was inspirational. Autostraddle writer Loraine enjoyed this line, declaring him their favorite character in Chrono Trigger. They expressed disappointment that he was a villain while praising the game for not making a joke out of Flea's ambiguous gender. However, they were unsure of how Flea was meant to be depicted, citing poor representation of trans and gender-nonconforming people during localization. Salon writer Luke Winkie also enjoyed this line. The Advocate writer Jacob Ogles regarded it as the "greatest pro-trans [line] in gaming history" and listed Flea as one of the best LGBT characters in video games. The Escapist writer Flynn Demarco held him as an example of trans women and crossdressers being made into villains, while author William Gibbons similarly found that androgyny in characters like Flea was used to indicate villainy.

References

Chrono (series) characters
LGBT characters in video games
Male characters in video games
Video game characters designed by Akira Toriyama
Video game characters introduced in 1995